Parliamentary elections were held in the Marshall Islands on 20 November 1995. As there were no political parties, all candidates for the 33 seats ran as independents. Eight new MPs were elected, whilst two members of the cabinet lost their seats. Following the election, Amata Kabua was re-elected President by MPs.

References

Elections in the Marshall Islands
1995 elections in Oceania
1995 in the Marshall Islands
Non-partisan elections